Ostrzyce  (Cashubian: Òstrzëce) lies approximately  west of Somonino,  south-west of Kartuzy, and  west of the regional capital Gdańsk.

For details of the history of the region, see History of Pomerania.

The village has a population of 460.

References

Ostrzyce